The Near Islands or Sasignan Islands are a group of American islands in the Aleutian Islands in southwestern Alaska, between the Russian Commander Islands to the west and the Rat Islands to the east.

Geography
The largest of the Near Islands are Attu and Agattu, which shelter a few rocks in the channel between them. The other important islands are the Semichi Islands to their northeast, notable among which are Alaid, Nizki and Shemya.

About 20 miles to the east-southeast from Shemya are small rocky reefs known as the Ingenstrem Rocks.

The total land area of all of the Near Islands is 1,143.785 km² (441.618 sq mi), and their total population was 47 persons as of the 2000 census. The only populated island is Shemya; the U.S. Coast Guard station on Attu closed in 2010 and all inhabitants left the island later that year.

History
The islands were named Near Islands by Russian explorers in the 18th century because they were the nearest of the Aleutian Islands to Russia (that is, if one excludes the Commander Islands).

During the Second World War, the Imperial Japanese Army occupied the Near Islands in 1942, being the first foreign military to occupy American soil since the War of 1812. American forces retook the islands during the Aleutian Islands Campaign in 1943.

References

 
Islands of Aleutians West Census Area, Alaska
Islands of the Aleutian Islands
Islands of Alaska
Islands of Unorganized Borough, Alaska